The Slim Dusty Movie is a 1984 Australian feature film directed by Rob Stewart and starring Slim Dusty, Joy McKean, Jon Blake and Mary Charleston.

The film

The film dramatises the early life and career of Australian country music singer/songwriter Slim Dusty, interspersed with footage of a 1980s round Australia tour by the Slim Dusty family and featuring several songs from Dusty's long career, including Pub With No Beer, When the Rain Tumbles Down in July, Lights on the Hill and Indian Pacific. Slim Dusty was Australia's most prolific musical artist, who died in 2003 while working on his 106th album for EMI Records. His wife Joy McKean and children Anne Kirkpatrick and David Kirpatrick are all accomplished country music singers who perform in the film on stage with Dusty. A number of Dusty's songwriters and old friends appear in the film, including Stan Coster and Gordon Parsons.

Directed by Rob Stewart (whose credits include 1983's For the Term of His Natural Life) and with cinematography by David Eggby (Mad Max, 1979), the film features Australian landscapes prominently and is essentially a biographical documentary. Shot in diverse locations, it includes live performances at the Sydney Opera House, Bowen, Charters Towers, Mount Isa, the Peppimenarti, Northern Territory aboriginal settlement and elsewhere.

Cast and crew
Director: Rob Stewart
Producer: Kent Chadwick
Cinematography: David Eggby
Music Producer: Rod Coe
Audio Post: Roger Savage
Sound Recordist: Paul Clarke
Sound Assistant: Chris Piper
Concert Sound Mixer:  Clive Jones
Slim Dusty as himself
Joy McKean as herself
Anne Kirkpatrick as herself
David Kirkpatrick as himself
Brett Lewis as Shorty Ranger
Dean Stidworthy as Young Slim Dusty
Jon Blake as Young Slim Dusty
Mary Charleston as Young Heather McKean
Earl Francis as the Country Radio announcer
Jeanette Leigh as Milkbar waitress
Sandy Paul as Young Joy McKean
Beverley Phillips as Slim's mother
Jimmy Sharman as himself
Tom Travers as Slim's father
James Wright as City Radio announcer

Box office
The Slim Dusty Movie grossed $225,000 at the box office in Australia.

Soundtrack
A soundtrack was released from the movie. It peaked at number 73 on the Australian Kent Music Report.

Track listing
LP/Cassette

Release history

See also
Cinema of Australia

References

External links

 
The Slim Dusty Movie at Oz Movies
 

Country music films
Musical films based on actual events
1980s musical films
1984 films
Slim Dusty albums
Australian musical films
Australian biographical films
Films about entertainers
Jukebox musical films
1984 soundtrack albums
Soundtracks by Australian artists
Films set in the 20th century
Films set in Sydney
Films set in the Outback
Films set in the Northern Territory
Films set in Queensland
Films shot in the Northern Territory
Films shot in New South Wales
Films shot in Queensland
Films set in the 1980s
1980s English-language films
1980s Australian films